Novosmolenka is a rural locality (a selo) in Verkh-Anuysky Selsoviet, Bystroistoksky District, Altai Krai, Russia. The population was 18 as of 2013. There is 1 street.

Geography 
Novosmolenka is located on the Anuy River, 42 km southeast of Bystry Istok (the district's administrative centre) by road. Smolensky is the nearest rural locality.

References 

Rural localities in Bystroistoksky District